The Recombination detection program (RDP) is a computer program used to analyse nucleotide sequence data and identify evidence of genetic recombination.  Besides applying a large number of different recombination detection methods it also implements various  phylogenetic tree construction methods and recombination hotspot tests. The latest version is RDP4.

See also
 Computational phylogenetics

References

External links
 Program home page
 Virus Evolution paper

Molecular biology
Science software